The 2007 Speedway Grand Prix of Denmark was the fourth race of the 2007 Speedway Grand Prix season.  It took place on 9 June in the Parken Stadium in Copenhagen, Denmark.

Starting positions draw 
The Speedway Grand Prix Commission has nominated Kenneth Bjerre (as Wild Card), Jesper B. Jensen and Morten Risager (both as Track Reserve).

(15) Chris Harris (United Kingdom)
(10) Antonio Lindbäck (Sweden)
(13) Wiesław Jaguś (Poland)
(14) Rune Holta (Poland)
(9) Jarosław Hampel (Poland)
(3) Nicki Pedersen (Denmark)
(2) Greg Hancock (United States)
(8) Tomasz Gollob (Poland)
(6) Hans N. Andersen (Denmark)
(7) Matej Žagar (Slovenia)
(12) Bjarne Pedersen (Denmark)
(5) Leigh Adams (Australia)
(11) Scott Nicholls (United Kingdom)
(1) Jason Crump (Australia)
(4) Andreas Jonsson (Sweden)
(16) Kenneth Bjerre (Denmark)
(17) Jesper B. Jensen (Denmark)
(18) Morten Risager (Denmark)

Heat details

Heat after heat 

 Lindbäck, Harris, Jaguś, Holta
 Hancock, Hampel, Gollob, Jensen (for N.Pedersen); N.Pedersen (t)
 Andersen, Adams, Žagar, B.Pedersen (f/x)
 Crump, Nicholls, Bjerre, Jonsson
 Andersen, Harris, Nicholls, Hampel
 N.Pedersen, Lindbäck, Crump, Risager (for Žagar)
 B.Pedersen, Jonsson, Jaguś, Hancock (f/x)
 Adams, Holta, Bjerre, Gollob
 N.Pedersen, Bjerre, B.Pedersen, Harris (e)
 Adams, Hampel, Jonsson, Lindbäck
 Gollob, Crump, Andersen, Jaguś
 Holta, Nicholls, Hancock, Jensen (for Žagar)
 Hancock, Adams, Crump, Harris
 Lindbäck, Gollob, Nicholls, B.Pedersen
 Bjerre, Risager (for Žagar), Jaguś, Hampel
 Jonsson, Andersen, N.Pedersen, Holta (f3)
 Gollob, Jonsson, Harris, Jensen (for Žagar)
 Andersen, Bjerre, Lindbäck, Hancock
 Adams, N.Pedersen, Nicholls, Jaguś
 Hampel, Crump, B.Pedersen, Holta
Semi-finals:
 Adams, Gollob, Bjerre, Crump
 N.Pedersen, Jonsson, Andersen (e3), Lindbäck (f/x)
Great Final:
 Jonsson (6), N.Pedersen (4), Adams (2), Gollob (0)

The intermediate classification

See also 
List of Speedway Grand Prix riders

References 

D
2007
2007 in Danish motorsport